Júlio César Fernandes (born 9 November 1996) is a Brazilian professional footballer who plays for Icelandic third-tier club KF, as a midfielder.

References

External links
Júlio César Fernandes at ZeroZero
Júlio César Fernandes at SvFF

1996 births
Living people
Footballers from Curitiba
Association football midfielders
Brazilian footballers
IFK Mariehamn players
Gefle IF players
Ytterhogdals IK players
Knattspyrnufélag Fjallabyggðar players
Veikkausliiga players
Ettan Fotboll players
Division 2 (Swedish football) players
2. deild karla players
Brazilian expatriate footballers
Expatriate footballers in Finland
Brazilian expatriate sportspeople in Finland
Expatriate footballers in Sweden
Brazilian expatriate sportspeople in Sweden
Expatriate footballers in Iceland
Brazilian expatriate sportspeople in Iceland